"The Way I Feel About You" is a song by American R&B singer-songwriter Karyn White.  It was released on November 7, 1991, from her album Ritual of Love (1991).  White wrote the song with its producers, Christopher Troy and Zac Harmon.

Charts

References 

1991 songs
Karyn White songs
New jack swing songs